Canente is the title of two French operas:
Canente (Collasse) (1700) by Pascal Collasse
Canente (Dauvergne) (1760) by Antoine Dauvergne